This is a list of butterflies of Burundi. About 150 species are known from Burundi, none of which are endemic.

Papilionidae

Papilioninae

Papilionini
Papilio charopus montuosus Joicey & Talbot, 1927
Papilio chrapkowskoides Storace, 1952
Papilio rex mimeticus Rothschild, 1897
Papilio jacksoni ruandana Le Cerf, 1924
Papilio leucotaenia Rothschild, 1908
Papilio mackinnoni Sharpe, 1891

Leptocercini
Graphium antheus (Cramer, 1779)
Graphium policenes (Cramer, 1775)
Graphium biokoensis (Gauthier, 1984)
Graphium gudenusi (Rebel, 1911)
Graphium angolanus baronis (Ungemach, 1932)
Graphium ridleyanus (White, 1843)
Graphium leonidas (Fabricius, 1793)
Graphium almansor uganda (Lathy, 1906)

Pieridae

Coliadinae
Eurema mandarinula (Holland, 1892)
Eurema regularis (Butler, 1876)
Eurema floricola leonis (Butler, 1886)
Catopsilia florella (Fabricius, 1775)
Colias electo pseudohecate Berger, 1940

Pierinae
Colotis auxo (Lucas, 1852)
Colotis incretus (Butler, 1881)

Pierini
Pontia helice johnstonii (Crowley, 1887)
Mylothris bernice berenicides Holland, 1896
Mylothris jacksoni Sharpe, 1891
Mylothris polychroma Berger, 1981
Mylothris rhodope (Fabricius, 1775)
Mylothris ruandana Strand, 1909
Mylothris rubricosta (Mabille, 1890)
Mylothris schumanni uniformis Talbot, 1944
Mylothris sjostedti hecqui Berger, 1952
Belenois calypso crawshayi Butler, 1894
Belenois raffrayi extendens (Joicey & Talbot, 1927)

Lycaenidae

Miletinae

Liphyrini
Aslauga marshalli Butler, 1899
Aslauga purpurascens Holland, 1890

Miletini
Lachnocnema bibulus (Fabricius, 1793)
Lachnocnema laches (Fabricius, 1793)
Lachnocnema riftensis Libert, 1996
Lachnocnema divergens Gaede, 1915

Poritiinae

Liptenini
Baliochila neavei Stempffer & Bennett, 1953

Theclinae
Hypolycaena jacksoni Bethune-Baker, 1906
Pilodeudorix congoana (Aurivillius, 1923)
Pilodeudorix zelomina (Rebel, 1914)
Deudorix lorisona baronica Ungemach, 1932
Capys catharus Riley, 1932

Polyommatinae

Lycaenesthini
Anthene afra (Bethune-Baker, 1910)
Anthene contrastata mashuna (Stevenson, 1937)
Anthene hobleyi kigezi Stempffer, 1961
Anthene indefinita (Bethune-Baker, 1910)
Anthene schoutedeni (Hulstaert, 1924)

Polyommatini
Uranothauma delatorum Heron, 1909
Uranothauma nubifer (Trimen, 1895)
Cacyreus tespis (Herbst, 1804)
Cacyreus virilis Stempffer, 1936
Harpendyreus major (Joicey & Talbot, 1924)
Leptotes marginalis (Stempffer, 1944)
Euchrysops crawshayi fontainei Stempffer, 1967
Euchrysops mauensis Bethune-Baker, 1923
Euchrysops subpallida Bethune-Baker, 1923
Thermoniphas distincta (Talbot, 1935)
Thermoniphas plurilimbata rutshurensis (Joicey & Talbot, 1921)

Riodinidae

Nemeobiinae
Abisara neavei Riley, 1932

Nymphalidae

Danainae

Danaini
Tirumala formosa mercedonia (Karsch, 1894)
Amauris albimaculata magnimacula Rebel, 1914
Amauris crawshayi oscarus Thurau, 1904
Amauris echeria terrena Talbot, 1940
Amauris ellioti Butler, 1895

Satyrinae

Melanitini
Gnophodes grogani Sharpe, 1901
Aphysoneura scapulifascia Joicey & Talbot, 1922

Satyrini
Bicyclus auricruda fulgidus Fox, 1963
Bicyclus aurivillii (Butler, 1896)
Bicyclus dentata (Sharpe, 1898)
Bicyclus jefferyi Fox, 1963
Bicyclus matuta (Karsch, 1894)
Bicyclus persimilis (Joicey & Talbot, 1921)
Bicyclus saussurei angustus Condamin, 1970
Bicyclus sebetus (Hewitson, 1877)
Bicyclus vansoni Condamin, 1965
Heteropsis perspicua (Trimen, 1873)
Heteropsis ubenica ugandica (Kielland, 1994)
Ypthima albida Butler, 1888
Ypthima granulosa Butler, 1883
Ypthima recta Overlaet, 1955
Neocoenyra kivuensis Seydel, 1929

Charaxinae

Charaxini
Charaxes fulvescens monitor Rothschild, 1900
Charaxes acuminatus kigezia van Someren, 1963
Charaxes macclounii Butler, 1895
Charaxes alticola Grünberg, 1911
Charaxes lucretius maximus van Someren, 1971
Charaxes ansorgei ruandana Talbot, 1932
Charaxes pollux (Cramer, 1775)
Charaxes druceanus obscura Rebel, 1914
Charaxes druceanus proximans Joicey & Talbot, 1922
Charaxes eudoxus lequeuxi Plantrou, 1982
Charaxes eudoxus raffaellae Plantrou, 1982
Charaxes tiridates tiridatinus Röber, 1936
Charaxes xiphares burgessi van Son, 1953
Charaxes montis Jackson, 1956
Charaxes opinatus Heron, 1909
Charaxes mafuga van Someren, 1969
Charaxes zoolina mafugensis Jackson, 1956
Charaxes schiltzei Bouyer, 1991
Charaxes crossleyi ansorgei (Rothschild, 1903)

Nymphalinae
Kallimoides rumia rattrayi (Sharpe, 1904)

Nymphalini
Vanessa dimorphica (Howarth, 1966)
Junonia artaxia Hewitson, 1864
Junonia natalica angolensis (Rothschild, 1918)
Junonia sophia infracta Butler, 1888
Protogoniomorpha parhassus (Drury, 1782)
Precis actia Distant, 1880
Precis ceryne (Boisduval, 1847)
Precis milonia wintgensi Strand, 1909
Precis pelarga (Fabricius, 1775)
Precis sinuata Plötz, 1880
Precis tugela pyriformis (Butler, 1896)
Hypolimnas misippus (Linnaeus, 1764)

Biblidinae

Biblidini
Ariadne pagenstecheri (Suffert, 1904)

Limenitinae

Neptidini
Neptis jordani Neave, 1910
Neptis morosa Overlaet, 1955

Adoliadini
Pseudargynnis hegemone (Godart, 1819)
Euriphene excelsior (Rebel, 1911)
Euriphene saphirina (Karsch, 1894)
Euphaedra zaddachii crawshayi Butler, 1895
Euphaedra diffusa Gaede, 1916
Euphaedra phosphor Joicey & Talbot, 1921

Heliconiinae

Acraeini
Acraea eltringhami Joicey & Talbot, 1921
Acraea asboloplintha Karsch, 1894
Acraea alcinoe camerunica (Aurivillius, 1893)
Acraea persanguinea (Rebel, 1914)
Acraea quadricolor latifasciata (Sharpe, 1892)
Acraea alicia (Sharpe, 1890)
Acraea amicitiae Heron, 1909
Acraea aurivillii Staudinger, 1896
Acraea bonasia (Fabricius, 1775)
Acraea serena (Fabricius, 1775)
Acraea goetzei Thurau, 1903
Acraea lycoa Godart, 1819
Acraea rangatana bettiana Joicey & Talbot, 1921
Acraea ventura ochrascens Sharpe, 1902
Acraea oreas Sharpe, 1891

Argynnini
Issoria baumanni baumanni (Rebel & Rogenhofer, 1894)
Issoria baumanni excelsior (Butler, 1896)

Vagrantini
Phalanta phalantha aethiopica (Rothschild & Jordan, 1903)

Hesperiidae

Coeliadinae
Coeliades forestan (Stoll, [1782])
Coeliades pisistratus (Fabricius, 1793)

Pyrginae

Celaenorrhinini
Eretis lugens (Rogenhofer, 1891)

Hesperiinae

Aeromachini
Acleros mackenii olaus (Plötz, 1884)
Fresna netopha (Hewitson, 1878)
Platylesches moritili (Wallengren, 1857)

Baorini
Brusa allardi Berger, 1967
Zenonia crasta Evans, 1937

Heteropterinae
Metisella abdeli (Krüger, 1928)

See also
Geography of Burundi
Central Zambezian miombo woodlands

References

Seitz, A. Die Gross-Schmetterlinge der Erde 13: Die Afrikanischen Tagfalter. Plates
Seitz, A. Die Gross-Schmetterlinge der Erde 13: Die Afrikanischen Tagfalter. Text (in German)

Burundi
Burundi
Burundi
Butterflies